This is a list of regencies and cities in North Sumatra province. As of October 2019, there were 25 regencies and 8 cities.

External links 

 
 
Regencies, Indonesia
Regencies and cities